Guillaume Rufin (born 26 May 1990) is a French professional tennis player. His highest singles ranking is World No. 81, achieved in September 2013. He received a wildcard into the 2009 French Open, his ATP-tier debut. In the first round, one day before his 19th birthday, he beat Eduardo Schwank, 6–1, 6–3, 6–3.

Rufin achieved another landmark in his young career on 25 October 2009, when he won the Florianópolis Challenger title in Brazil, beating Pere Riba in the final, 6–4, 3–6, 6–3.

He reached the quarterfinals of the 2010 Open 13 in Marseille. In the first round, Rufin defeated lucky loser Laurent Recouderc, 7–5, 4–6, 7–6. He followed this up by defeating Yannick Mertens of Belgium, 6–3, 2–6, 6–2. He eventually fell to World No. 92 Mischa Zverev, 7–5, 6–7, 6–3.

Rufin received a wildcard into the 2010 US Open and defeated Leonardo Mayer in four sets before losing to Paul-Henri Mathieu in the second round.

Challenger finals

Singles: 7 (3–4)

Doubles: 1 (0–1)

Performance timelines

Singles 
Current until US Open.

 Doubles Current as far as the 2014 US Open (tennis).

External links

French male tennis players
1990 births
Living people
Sportspeople from Ain